Pt. Jawahar Lal Nehru Memorial Medical College is a government medical college and hospital in Raipur, Chhattisgarh, India. It was founded on 9 September 1963, and recognised by the Medical Council of India in 1969.The college is one of the oldest institutions in state of Chhattisgarh. The B. R. Ambedkar Memorial Hospital established in 1995 in the college campus is the affiliated teaching hospital. The radiotherapy department of this medical college is a government approved Regional Cancer Centre.

References 

Regional Cancer Centres in India
Hospitals in Chhattisgarh
Medical colleges in Chhattisgarh
Education in Raipur, Chhattisgarh
Monuments and memorials to Jawaharlal Nehru
1963 establishments in Madhya Pradesh
Educational institutions established in 1963